(provisional designation ) is an asteroid on an eccentric orbit, classified as a near-Earth object and potentially hazardous asteroid of the Amor group, with a diameter of . It was discovered on 24 July 1998, by astronomers of the Near-Earth Asteroid Tracking (NEAT) program at the Haleakala Observatory, Hawaii. It is one of the brightest and therefore largest potentially hazardous asteroids known to exist. With an observation arc of 32 years, the asteroid has a well-determined orbit, and its trajectory is well known through the year 2197. The asteroid's orbit is only potentially hazardous on a time scale of thousands of years.

Orbit and classification 

 is a member of the dynamical Amor group of near-Earth asteroids, and therefore does not currently cross Earth's orbit. The asteroid's closest approach to the Sun is just outside Earth's farthest distance from the Sun. When the asteroid has a perihelion point less than 1.017 AU (Earth's aphelion), it is classified an Apollo asteroid. This asteroid's category flips back and forth as time passes, due to minor perturbations of its orbit.

It orbits the Sun at a distance of 1.0–3.7 AU once every 3 years and 8 months (1,344 days; semi-major axis of 2.38 AU). Its orbit has a high eccentricity of 0.57 and an inclination of ° with respect to the ecliptic. With its sufficiently large aphelion, this asteroid is also classified as a Mars-crosser, crossing the orbit of Mars at 1.66 AU.

The body's observation arc begins with a precovery published by the Digitized Sky Survey taken at the Siding Spring Observatory in June 1986, more than 12 years prior to its official discovery observation at Haleakala Observatory, Hawaii.

Close approaches 
With an absolute magnitude of approximately 15.8,  is one of the brightest and presumably largest-known potentially hazardous asteroids (see PHA-list). The asteroid's orbit is only potentially hazardous on a time scale of hundreds, if not thousands, of years.

With observations as recent as April 2020 and a 32-year observation arc, the 2020 close approach distance was known with an accuracy of roughly ±6 km. (For comparison, Venus will be  from Earth on 3 June 2020.)

Physical characteristics 

According to observations by the NASA IRTF telescope during the ExploreNEOs Warm Spitzer program,  is a rather rare L-type asteroid. Delay-Doppler radar observations by the Arecibo Observatory in April 2020 have shown that  bears a large, crater-like concavity in its shape. These radar observations have also resolved several other topographic features on the asteroid's surface, such as hills and ridges.

Rotation period 
Lightcurve analysis gave a rotation period of 3.198 and 4.112 hours with a brightness amplitude of 0.29 and 0.16 magnitude, respectively. The latter rotation period of 4.1 hours was later confirmed by radar observations of the asteroid in 2020.

Diameter and albedo 
The Collaborative Asteroid Lightcurve Link (CALL) assumes a standard albedo for stony asteroids of 0.20 and calculates a diameter of  based on an absolute magnitude of 15.7. It is the first near-earth asteroid to show evidence of shock darkening: the slow darkening of the surface over time, from micrometeorites and solar wind.

Naming 
As of 2020, this minor planet has not been named.

References

External links 
 Asteroid Lightcurve Database (LCDB), query form (info )
 Asteroids and comets rotation curves, CdR – Observatoire de Genève, Raoul Behrend
 
 
 

052768
052768
052768
19980724
20200429
052768